Milton Gómez Mamani (26 September 1948 – 3 December 2022) was a Bolivian trade unionist and politician. A member of the Movement for Socialism, he served as Minister of Mining and Metallurgy for five days in January 2010 and was Minister of Labor, Employment, and Social Security from January to November 2019.

Gómez died in La Paz on 3 December 2022, at the age of 74.

References

1948 births
2022 deaths
21st-century Bolivian politicians
Executive Secretaries of the Bolivian Workers' Center
Movement for Socialism (Bolivia) politicians
Government ministers of Bolivia
People from Oruro Department